Context collapse or "the flattening of multiple audiences into a single context" is a term arising out of the study of human interaction on the internet, especially within social media. Context collapse "generally occurs when a surfeit of different audiences occupy the same space, and a piece of information intended for one audience finds its way to another" with that new audience's reaction being uncharitable and highly negative for failing to understand the original context.

History 

The term grew out of the work of Erving Goffman and Joshua Meyrowitz. In his book No Sense of Place (1985), Meyrowitz first applied the concept to media like television and the radio. He claimed that this new kind of technology broke barriers between different kinds of audiences as the content being produced was broadcast widely. In The Presentation of Self in Everyday Life, Erving Goffman argues that individuals develop "audience segregation" whereby they make sure that they segregate one audience to whom they perform one role from the other audiences to whom they play a different role. Context collapse arises out of the failure to do so. This partly because of the inclination to imply during an interaction that one's performance is their most important role performance (an impression that would collapse if different audiences to whom one performs differently were to be integrated) and that there is a uniqueness to one's relationship and role performance to a given audience. The term was first used in print by danah boyd, Alice Marwick, and Michael Wesch. Boyd is credited with coining the term "collapsed contexts" in the early 2000s in reference to social media sites like Myspace and Friendster.

In social media 
The concept of context collapse has become much more prominent with the rise of social media because many of these platforms, like Twitter, restrict users from specifically identifying and determining their audience. On Twitter, context collapse is seen with the retweeting functionality. When a public user posts a social media post known as a 'tweet', it can be retweeted by anyone, thus introducing the content to a new audience. To avoid any unwanted attention, some users may resort to the 'lowest common denominator' approach. This is when a user may only post content online they know would be appropriate for all of their audience members.

Types of context collapse 
As defined by linguist Jenny L. Davis and sociologist Nathan Jurgenson, there are two main types of context collapse: context collusions and context collisions. Context collusions are considered to be intentional while context collisions are considered to be unintentional.

An example of context collusion offline may be a wedding where different social circles are purposefully combined. Online, context collusion is seen on social media sites like Facebook where one may create a post to garner attention from various social groups. 

Context collision is seen in the case where someone makes a joke about someone else, not realizing they are also listening. On the web, an example of context collision is when companies accidentally make private information about their users available.

References

Sociological terminology
Linguistics